Art line may refer to:
Arterial line, a catheter placed into an artery to measure blood pressure
Artificial transmission line, a four-terminal electrical network

See also
 Artline (disambiguation)